Prabhsimran Singh born 10 August 2000) is an Indian cricketer who plays for Punjab Kings in the Indian Premier League (IPL).

He made his List A debut for the India Emerging Team against the Afghanistan Emerging Team in the 2018 ACC Emerging Teams Asia Cup on 7 December 2018. Later the same month, he was bought by the Kings XI Punjab in the player auction for the 2019 Indian Premier League. He made his Twenty20 debut for Punjab in the 2018–19 Syed Mushtaq Ali Trophy on 21 February 2019.

In the 2020 IPL auction, he was bought again by the Kings XI Punjab ahead of the 2020 Indian Premier League. In February 2022, he was again bought by the Punjab Kings in the auction for the 2022 Indian Premier League tournament. He made his first-class debut on 17 February 2022, for Punjab in the 2021–22 Ranji Trophy, where he scored a century.

References

External links
 

2000 births
Living people
Indian cricketers
Punjab Kings cricketers
Punjab, India cricketers
Place of birth missing (living people)